The Men's 20 kilometre individual biathlon competition at the 1998 Winter Olympics was held on 11 February, at Nozawa Onsen. Competitors raced over five loops of a 4.0 kilometre skiing course, shooting four times, twice prone and twice standing. Each miss resulted in one minute being added to a competitor's skiing time.

Results

References

Men's biathlon at the 1998 Winter Olympics